Izrael is the spelling of Israel in several European languages. 

Izrael may also refer to:

People 
 Izrael Abraham Staffel (1814–1884), Polish inventor
Izrael Poznański (1833–1900), Polish industrialist
Izrael Hieger (1901–1986), Polish-born British biochemist
Izrael Chaim Wilner (1917–1943), Polish-Jewish resistance fighter during World War II
Eva Grlić (née Izrael; 1920–2008), Croatian journalist and writer
 Yuri Izrael (1930–2014), Russian environmental scientist

Music 

 Izrael (band), a Polish reggae band

See also
 Azrael, the angel of death in Islam and some traditions of Judaism
 Israel (disambiguation)